Rock 102 may refer to either of two radio stations:

CJDJ-FM, Saskatoon, Saskatchewan, Canada
WAQY, Springfield, Massachusetts, US